Ustad Enayat Khan (1894–1938) also known as Nath Singh was one of India's most influential sitar and surbahar players in the first decades of the 20th century. He was the father of Vilayat Khan, one of the topmost sitariyas (sitar players) of the postwar period.

Early life
Enayat Khan was born in the North-Western Provinces into a family of musicians. His father was the great sitar maestro Imdad Khan, who taught him the sitar and surbahar (bass sitar) in the family style, known as the Imdadkhani Gharana or Etawah Gharana (school), named after a small village near Agra called Etawah. He married Basiran Bibi, daughter of khyal singer Bande Hussain.

Performing career
He settled with his family in Calcutta, where, though he only lived to 43, he did much pioneering work on the sitar. For example, he standardised its physical dimensions and added the upper resonator gourd, which is very popular with today's players (though his own descendants have not been using it).
"True, Vilayat Khan did not play the rapid-fire multi-stroke 'taan-toda' in which his father (Enayat Khan) excelled; but it can be conjectured with a fair amount of certainty that this was because he did not want to enter an area already developed to the hilt by Ustad Enayat Khan."

In a place rapidly developing into an important North Indian centre of the arts, at a time where interest in national culture was strong fuelled by the struggle for independence, he brought sitar music out from its narrow connoisseur circles to new mass audiences. Nobel laureate Rabindranath Tagore was a musical collaborator and personal friend. Some of Enayat Khan's recordings have been released on CD, on the Great Gharanas: Imdadkhani compilation in RPG/EMI's Chairman's Choice series.

Death
Enayat Khan died young, with four children. His two sons, Vilayat Khan and Imrat, were trained in the Imdadkhani gharana style by other members of his extended family. Vilayat learned the sitar and Imrat the surbahar; both were to become very famous classical musicians later.

References

1890s births
1938 deaths
Etawah gharana
Hindustani instrumentalists
20th-century Indian male classical singers
Sitar players
Pupils of Imdad Khan